Večeslavci (or Sessldorf) is a village in the Municipality of Rogašovci in the Prekmurje region of northeastern Slovenia.

The Lutheran teacher and poet István Szijjártó was born in the village.

References

External links
Večeslavci on Geopedia

Populated places in the Municipality of Rogašovci